Mooers's law is an empirical observation of behavior made by American computer scientist Calvin Mooers in 1959. The observation is made in relation to information retrieval and the interpretation of the observation is used commonly throughout the information profession both within and outside its original context.

Original interpretation

Mooers argued that information is at risk of languishing unused due not only on the effort required to assimilate it but also to any fallout that could arise from the discovery of information that conflicts with the user's personal, academic or corporate interests. In interacting with new information, a user runs the risk of proving their work incorrect or even irrelevant. Instead, Mooers argued, users prefer to remain in a state of safety in which new arguments are ignored in an attempt to save potential embarrassment or reprisal from supervisors.

Out-of-context interpretation

The more commonly used interpretation of Mooers's law is considered to be a derivation of the principle of least effort first stated by George Kingsley Zipf. This interpretation focuses on the amount of effort that will be expended to use and understand a particular information retrieval system before the information seeker "gives up", and the law is often paraphrased to increase the focus on the retrieval system:

In this interpretation, "painful and troublesome" comes from using the retrieval system.

See also

 Availability heuristic
 Cognitive dissonance
 Confirmation bias
 Satisficing

References

External links
 Calvin N. Mooers Papers, 1930-1992 at the Charles Babbage Institute, University of Minnesota.
 Oral history interview with Calvin N. Mooers and Charlotte D. Mooers at the Charles Babbage Institute.  Interview discusses information retrieval and programming language research from World War II through the early 1990s.

Computer architecture statements
Empirical laws
Eponyms
Information retrieval evaluation